The 1966 European Cup final was a football match held at the Heysel Stadium, Brussels, on 11 May 1966 that saw Real Madrid of Spain defeat FK Partizan of Yugoslavia 2–1 to win the 1965–66 European Cup title.

Route to the final

Match

Summary
 
The final was a competitive match. First Partizan took the lead through a goal by Velibor Vasović in the 55th minute, but Real Madrid soon took over, getting an equaliser in the 70th minute from Spanish international Amancio Amaro. Real Madrid got the winner in the 76th minute from Fernando Serena. With this goal, Real Madrid sealed their win and became European Champions once again.

This was Real Madrid's sixth European Cup triumph in the 11 years of the tournament's existence. However, Los Blancos would not win the competition again until 1998, when Predrag Mijatović–– who was, ironically, a former Partizan player–– scored the winning goal in the 66th minute of the final.

Details

See also
1965–66 European Cup
FK Partizan in European football
Real Madrid CF in international football competitions

References

External links
1965–66 season at UEFA website
 1965–66 season at europeancuphistory.com

1
European Cup Final 1966
1966
European Cup Final 1966
European Cup Final 1966
UEFA Champions League finals
European Cup Final, 1966
European
Euro
May 1966 sports events in Europe
1960s in Brussels